A rear-view mirror (or rearview mirror) is a flat mirror in automobiles and other vehicles, designed to allow the driver to see rearward through the vehicle's rear window (rear windshield).

In cars, the rear-view mirror is usually affixed to the top of the windshield on a double-swivel mount allowing it to be adjusted to suit the height and viewing angle of any driver and to swing harmlessly out of the way if impacted by a vehicle occupant in a collision.

The rear-view mirror is augmented by one or more side-view mirrors, which serve as the only rear-vision mirrors on trucks, motorcycles and bicycles.

History 

Among the rear-view mirror's early uses is a mention by Dorothy Levitt in her 1909 book The Woman and the Car which noted that women should "carry a little hand-mirror in a convenient place when driving" so they may "hold the mirror aloft from time to time in order to see behind while driving in traffic".  However, earlier use is described in 1906, in a trade magazine noting mirrors for showing what is coming behind now popular on closed bodied automobiles, and to likely be widely adopted in a short time. The same year, a Mr. Henri Cain from France patented a "Warning mirror for automobiles". The Argus Dash Mirror, adjustable to any position to see the road behind, appeared in 1908. Earliest known rear-view mirror mounted on a racing vehicle appeared on Ray Harroun's Marmon race car at the inaugural Indianapolis 500 race in 1911. Harroun himself claimed he got the idea from seeing a mirror used for a similar purpose on a horse-drawn vehicle in 1904. Harroun also claimed that the mirror vibrated constantly due to the rough brick surface, and it was rendered largely useless.

Elmer Berger is usually credited with inventing the rear-view mirror, though in fact he was the first to patent it (1921) and develop it for incorporation into production street going automobiles by his Berger and Company.

Augmentations and alternatives 
Recently, rear-view video cameras have been built into many new model cars, this was partially in response to the rear-view mirrors' inability to show the road directly behind the car, due to the rear deck or trunk obscuring as much as 3–5 meters (10–15  feet) of road behind the car. As many as 50 small children are killed by SUVs every year in the USA because the driver cannot see them in their rear-view mirrors. Camera systems are usually mounted to the rear bumper or lower parts of the car, allowing for better rear visibility.

Aftermarket secondary rear-view mirrors are available. They attach to the main rear-view mirror and are independently adjustable to view the back seat. This is useful to enable adults to monitor children in the back seat.

Anti-glare 

A prismatic rear-view mirror—sometimes called a "day/night mirror"—can be tilted to reduce the brightness and glare of lights, mostly for high-beam headlights of vehicles behind which would otherwise be reflected directly into the driver's eyes at night. This type of mirror is made of a piece of glass that is wedge-shaped in cross-section—its front and rear surfaces are not parallel.

On manual tilt versions, a tab is used to adjust the mirror between "day" and "night" positions. In the day view position, the front surface is tilted and the reflective back side gives a strong reflection. When the mirror is moved to the night view position, its reflecting rear surface is tilted out of line with the driver's view. This view is actually a reflection of the low-reflection front surface; only a much-reduced amount of light is reflected in the driver's eyes.

"Manual tilt" day/night mirrors first began appearing in the 1930s and became standard equipment on most passenger cars and trucks by the early 1970s.

Automatic dimming
In the 1940s, American inventor Jacob Rabinow developed a light-sensitive automatic mechanism for the wedge-type day/night mirror. Several Chrysler Corporation cars offered these automatic mirrors as optional equipment as early as 1959, but few customers ordered them for their cars and the item was soon withdrawn from the option lists. Several automakers began offering rear-view mirrors with automatic dimming again in 1983, and it was in the late 1980s that they began to catch on in popularity.

Current systems usually use photosensors mounted in the rear-view mirror to detect light and dim the mirror by means of electrochromism. This electrochromic feature has also been incorporated into side-view mirrors allowing them to dim and reduce glare as well.

Suspending objects

Objects are sometimes hung from the rear-view mirror, including cross necklaces, prayer beads, good luck charms, decorations like fuzzy dice, and air fresheners like Little Trees. In some jurisdictions such hanging is illegal on the basis that it impairs the driver's forward view and so compromises safety. Black Lives Matter protesters have cited this as an example of the minor violations used as grounds for traffic stops disproportionately targeting black drivers.

Trucks and buses 
On trucks and buses, the load often blocks rearward vision out the backlight. In the U.S. virtually all trucks and buses have a side view mirror on each side, often mounted on the doors and viewed out the side windows, which are used for rear vision. These mirrors leave a large unviewable ("blind") area behind the vehicle, which tapers down as the distance increases. This is a safety issue which the driver must compensate for, often with a person guiding the truck back in congested areas, or by backing in a curve. "Spot mirrors", a convex mirror which provides a distorted image of the entire side of the vehicle, are commonly mounted on at least the right side of a vehicle. In the U.S. mirrors are considered "safety equipment", and are not included in width restrictions.

Motorcycles 
Depending on the type of motorcycle, the motorcycle may or may not have rear-view mirrors. Street-legal motorcycles are generally required to have rear-view mirrors. Motorcycles for off-road use only normally do not have rear-view mirrors. Rear-view mirrors come in various shapes and designs and have various methods of mounting the mirrors to the motorcycle, most commonly to the handlebars. Rear-view mirrors can also be attached to the rider's motorcycle helmet.

Bicycles 
Some bicycles are equipped with a rear-view mirror mounted on a handlebar.  Rear-view mirrors may also be fitted to the bicycle frame, on a helmet on the arm or the frame of a pair of eyeglasses. This allows what is behind to be checked continuously without turning round.  Rear-view mirrors almost never come with a new bicycle and require an additional purchase.

Aircraft
In 1956, the Civil Aeronautical Administration proposed a rear-view mirror mounted right above the pilot to keep an eye when private aircraft are landing or taxiing on the runway to prevent collisions. Fighter aircraft usually have one or more rear-view mirrors mounted on the front canopy frame to watch out for chasing aircraft.

Computer monitors 
Some computer monitors are fitted with rear-view mirrors to see if anyone is positioned behind the user where they can see sensitive information, such as names and passwords, being keyed in or on the screen. These are used especially on automated teller machines and similar.

See also
 
 Automatic parking
 Backup collision
 Backup camera
 Blind spot monitor
 Blind spot (vehicle)
 Dashcam
 Intelligent Parking Assist System
 Experimental Safety Vehicle (ESV)
 Intelligent car
 Lane departure warning system
 Precrash system
 Wing mirror

References

1911 introductions
Mirrors
Vehicle parts